Pheidole elecebra is a species of ant in the genus Pheidole. It is endemic to the United States.

References

External links

elecebra
Insects of the United States
Endemic fauna of the United States
Hymenoptera of North America
Insects described in 1904
Taxonomy articles created by Polbot